Matthew John Kyoo Purcell (known professionally as Matt Purcell), is an Australian entrepreneur, speaker, presenter, author and musician. He is the founder of creative agency Mentored Media and CEO of Social Kung Fu.

Early life 
Purcell was born in Jeollabuk-do from Province of South Korea. His birth mother took him to an orphanage to which he was adopted by Australian parents. He was raised in Newcastle, Australia.

Career 
Purcell has been on national television and has featured in national campaigns for brands such as Ford Motors and LG Australia. In 2017, He received a diploma qualification in Life Coaching.

In May 2018, he released his first book, Life Hacks for Mindful Living.

In 2019, he founded the Mentored Media a creative agency.

In 2020, he founded Social Kung Fu a verbal self defense and confidence training. Social Kung Fu provides schools with a series of modules designed to educate and support students to defend themselves verbally and when using online forums, particularly social media.

He works as a mentor for young people and regularly speaks on marketing topics, as well as around mental health and wellbeing.

His podcast ranked #1 on the Australia  charts called The Examined Life and has won awards for best young entrepreneurship and social media marketing awards. Matt has made it his life goal to give back and help people who feel as though they don't fit in.

For eight years he ran a multi campus business that was an NDIS provider mentoring hundreds of youth a week in music tutoring, academic tutoring and life coaching.

Books 

 Life Hacks For Mindful Living

References

External links 

 Official website

Year of birth missing (living people)
Living people
People from Newcastle, New South Wales
Australian businesspeople